Sallie J. Seals White was Kentucky’s first African American female lawyer.

White was born around 1871 in Kentucky. She earned her bachelor's degree from Fisk University and began serving as an instructor for Central Law School in 1892. She married Albert S. White, Esq. around the same year, who would later serve as the Dean of Central Law School from 1895-1911.

In 1904, she formally graduated from Central Law School and became the first African American female admitted to practice law in Kentucky. In addition to serving as a dean, her husband became the Head of the National Negro Bar Association in 1909. He was shot to death in 1911. While census records from the time do indicate that White and her husband had children, it is uncertain what ultimately became of the family.

See also 

 List of first women lawyers and judges in Kentucky

References 

Kentucky lawyers
African-American lawyers
20th-century American women lawyers
20th-century American lawyers
Fisk University alumni